Adam Guettel (born December 16, 1964) is an American composer-lyricist of musical theater and opera. The grandson of musical theatre composer Richard Rodgers, he is best known for his musical The Light in the Piazza, for which he won the Tony Award for Best Original Score and the Tony Award for Best Orchestrations.

Biography

Early years
Guettel was born on December 16, 1964, to film executive Henry Guettel and writer/composer Mary Rodgers, daughter of famed composer Richard Rodgers, and was raised on the Upper West Side of New York City. He performed as a boy soprano soloist in operas including Pelléas et Mélisande and The Magic Flute, both at the Metropolitan Opera and the New York City Opera, and in another production of Pelléas with the Santa Fe Opera. He was also slated to play Amahl in the film remake of Gian Carlo Menotti's "Amahl and the Night Visitors". He later claimed that he ended his career as a boy soprano at age 13, by faking that his voice was changing; he turned to music composition soon afterward.  He attended Phillips Exeter Academy, School Year Abroad (SYA France), Interlochen Center for the Arts and graduated from Yale University in 1987.

Career
His early works include 1996's Floyd Collins, Love's Fire, and Saturn Returns (which was recorded as Myths and Hymns).  Guettel's music was almost immediately characterized by its complexity and chromaticism.  His major influences include Igor Stravinsky, Maurice Ravel, Claude Debussy, Benjamin Britten, and Stevie Wonder. Stephen Sondheim has referred to Guettel's work as "dazzling."  Guettel's songs have been recorded by such artists as Audra McDonald and Brian d'Arcy James. He also contributed original scores to several documentary films, including Arguing the World and Jack: The Last Kennedy Film. In 1999, he performed a concert evening of his own work at New York's Town Hall.

In 2004, Guettel contributed vocals to Jessica Molaskey's P.S. Classics album Make Believe, dueting with Molaskey on his grandfather's song "Glad To Be Unhappy."  After six years working on the project, Guettel's musical The Light in the Piazza opened on Broadway in 2005.  The show, which starred Victoria Clark and Kelli O'Hara, met with mixed critical notices, but on June 5, 2005, Adam Guettel won the Tony Award for Best Original Score and the Tony Award for Best Orchestrations.

He spent much of the period from 2005 to 2007 working on a musical adaptation of The Princess Bride with original screenwriter William Goldman.  As of January 2007, Guettel had written the music for ten songs for the project.  An orchestral suite from the score was performed at the Hollywood Bowl in November 2006, and Lincoln Center conducted a workshop of Bride in January 2007.  The project was abandoned when Goldman reportedly demanded 75 percent of the author's share, even though Guettel was writing both the music and the lyrics.

In summer 2007, Guettel composed incidental music for a production of Anton Chekhov's play Uncle Vanya at the Intiman Playhouse in Seattle, Washington.

In July 2009, the Signature Theatre of Arlington, Virginia, commissioned Guettel to write a new musical for their 2011-2012 season, under the auspices of their American Musical Voices Project. Currently in the works, this will be a musical adaptation of the Danny Boyle film Millions. Other current projects include an opera based on the short stories of Washington Irving and the opera, The Invisible Man, commissioned by the Houston Grand Opera.

In 2019, Guettel's score for Aaron Sorkin's play To Kill A Mockingbird was nominated for a Tony Award. 

In January 2023, Atlantic Theater Company announced an eight-week world premiere production of Guettel's adaptation of Days of Wine and Roses, with music, lyrics, and orchestrations by Guettel, book by Craig Lucas (Guettel's collaborator on The Light in the Piazza, almost 20 years previously), and direction by Michael Greif. The production, running in May and June 2023, will star Kelli O'Hara and Brian D'Arcy James, and will be the first full production of a new musical by Guettel since Piazza. 

Another major aspect of Guettel's career is his work as a teacher. Since 1995, he has taught masterclasses and seminars in musical theatre performance and songwriting, considering this to be an important complement to his work as a composer. He has led such classes at DePauw University, DePaul University, New York University, Pace University, Harvard University, Yale University, Princeton University, Emerson College, Elon University, The Boston Conservatory, Southern Methodist University, Syracuse University, Wagner College and many others.

Guettel received an honorary doctorate from Lehman College in 2007.

Family
Guettel is the son of composer, author and Juilliard School chairman Mary Rodgers, who died on June 26, 2014, and grandson of legendary musical theater composer Richard Rodgers. His father, Henry Guettel (died October 7, 2013), was a film executive and was the executive director of the Theatre Development Fund.

When Guettel took up music composition in his mid-teens, he was encouraged by his family.  His mother said that she offered him advice for around a year, "After that, he was so far beyond anything I could ever have dreamed of, I just backed off."  Richard Rodgers, who died when Guettel was 15, overheard an early composition, said he liked it and asked him to play it louder.  Guettel has qualified the compliment, noting that "He was literally on his deathbed on the other side of the living-room wall."  In his high school and collegiate years and into his early twenties, Guettel worked as a rock and jazz musician, singing and playing bass, before realizing "that writing for character and telling stories through music was something that I really loved to do, and that allowed me to express love."

Influences
In an interview, Guettel stated a portion of his influences that included I. M. Pei, Louis Kahn, Vincent Scully, Jane Jacobs, Igor Stravinsky, Stevie Wonder, Adam de la Halle, Harry Nilsson, Ruth Bader Ginsburg, Steve Jobs, Björk, Erich Wolfgang Korngold, Benjamin Britten, William Inge, Stephen Sondheim, Jody Williams, and Marvin Gaye.

References

External links
 
 
 Adam Guettel Papers at the Library of Congress
 .
 .
 .
Adam Guettel's website

American musical theatre composers
American musical theatre lyricists
American people of German-Jewish descent
Broadway composers and lyricists
Jewish American composers
Jewish American musicians
Jewish American songwriters
Phillips Exeter Academy alumni
Songwriters from New York (state)
Tony Award winners
Drama Desk Award winners
Nonesuch Records artists
Yale University alumni
1964 births
Living people
People from the Upper West Side
21st-century American Jews